Joga may refer to:

"Jóga", a song by Björk
Kartam Joga, Indian political activist
Soyam Joga, Indian politician

See also

Yoga (disambiguation)